Mai FM is New Zealand's largest urban contemporary radio network, promoting Māori language and culture and broadcasting hip hop and rhythm and blues. It is located in Auckland, and is available in ten markets around the country. The network targets 15- to 34-year-olds, and reaches an estimated 382,300 different listeners each week.

History

Mai FM began broadcasting to Auckland in July 1992. It was run by one of the largest Maori tribes in New Zealand, Ngati Whatua, and Mai Media. Between 1996 and 2005 Mai FM also operated a second station, Ruia Mai, on 1179 AM in Auckland with all programming in the Māori language.

From 1996 to 2001 Mai FM could be heard in Christchurch on 90.5 FM, due to an agreement between Ngati Whatua and Kai Tahu iwi. The Christchurch station was originally 90.5 Tahu FM, with local on air talent, and formatted with the Mai FM Auckland music. In late 2001 the joint agreement ended and the Mai FM branding of the station in Christchurch ceased, reverting to its original name of Tahu FM. In 1996 Ngati Whatua also came to an agreement with the Te Arawa iwi to broadcast Mai FM in Rotorua on 96.7 FM, over the years the frequency changed to 99.1 and is now broadcasting on 105.5.

On 29 February 2008 it was announced that MediaWorks New Zealand had bought the station and would take it over on 31 March 2008. Since the MediaWorks' takeover there has been significant programming and branding changes as well as the creation of the Mai FM network.

Programming 
Mai FM is a networked station with all shows and music broadcasting from its Auckland studios.

The Mai Hot 1000 The Mai Hot 1000 is one of the station's annual countdown features. The chart order, including which artists and songs feature, is voted by listeners on the station's official website. The countdown runs on weekdays over a three-week period started in 2013 as The Mai Hot 500 according to their official Instagram page. It was renamed The Mai Hot 900 in 2014 and expanded by 300 songs in 2020. Then in 2022 it had 200 songs removed due to the launch of The Mai Hip Hop 100 and The Mai RnB 100 Countdowns.

Winners 
2022 - J. Cole - "No Role Modelz"
2021 - TLC - "No Scrubs"
2020 - 2pac - "Changes"
2019 - The Notorious B.I.G - "Juicy"
2018 - 2pac - "California Love"
2017 - Bone Thugs N Harmony - "Tha Crossroads"
2016 - 2pac - "Changes"
2015 - 2pac - "Changes"
2014 - 2pac - "California Love"
2013 - 2pac - "Changes"

Stations

Frequencies

These are the frequencies for Mai FM:

 Whangarei - 107.3 FM (low power)
 Auckland - 88.6 FM
 Hamilton - 105.8 FM
 Tauranga - 96.6 FM
 Rotorua - 105.5 FM
 Gisborne - 89.3 FM
 Hawke's Bay - 105.5 FM
 Manawatu - 97.0 FM
 Wellington - 100.5 FM
 Christchurch - 106.8 FM (low power)

References

External links 
Mai FM official website

Māori culture in Auckland
Radio stations in Auckland
New Zealand radio networks
Urban contemporary radio stations
Māori mass media
Radio stations established in 1992